Officium is a 1994 album by Norwegian saxophonist Jan Garbarek and early music vocal group Hilliard Ensemble. Based on 12th- to 16th-century liturgical works by composers including Cristóbal de Morales and Perotinus Magnus, the album was recorded at the monastery of Propstei St. Gerold in Austria.

Reception 
AllMusic awards the album with 3½ stars and Richard S. Ginell's review says: "Recorded in a heavily reverberant Austrian monastery, the voices sometimes develop in overwhelming waves, and Garbarek rides their crest, his soprano saxophone soaring in the monastery acoustic, or he underscores the voices almost unobtrusively, echoing the voices, finding ample room to move around the modal harmonies yet applying his sound sparingly."  Marius Gabriel remarked that Officium is "what Coltrane hears in heaven."

Brought together by Manfred Eicher, this collaboration has become one of the most successful releases on the ECM label, achieving sales of more than 1.5 million. Following a number of successful concert tours, a second collaborative album, Mnemosyne, was released in 1999. Officium Novum, another sequel album, was released in September 2010.

Track listing
 "Parce mihi domine" (from the Officium Defunctorum by Cristóbal de Morales) – 6:42 
 "Primo tempore" (Anonymous) – 8:03
 "Sanctus" (Anonymous) – 4:44
 "Regnanten Sempiterna" (Anonymous) – 5:36
 "O Salutaris Hostia" (Pierre de la Rue) – 4:34
 "Procedentem sponsum" (Anonymous) – 2:50
 "Pulcherrima rosa" (Anonymous) – 6:55
 "Parce mihi domine" (de Morales) – 5:35 
 "Beata viscera" (Magister Perotinus) – 6:34
 "De spineto nata rosa" (Anonymous) – 2:30
 "Credo" (Anonymous) – 2:06
 "Ave maris stella" (Guillaume Du Fay) – 4:14
 "Virgo flagellatur" (Anonymous) – 5:19
 "Oratio Ieremiae" (Anonymous) – 5:00
 "Parce mihi domine" (de Morales) – 6:52

Personnel 

Hilliard Ensemble:
David James – countertenor
Rogers Covey-Crump – tenor
John Potter – tenor
Gordon Jones – baritone

Jan Garbarek – soprano and tenor saxophones
Peter Laenger - Tonmeister

Certifications

References

1994 classical albums
ECM Records albums
Jan Garbarek albums
Albums produced by Manfred Eicher